Aitchisoniella himalayensis is a species of liverwort in the family Exormothecaceae. Its natural habitats are rocky areas and cold desert of Sichuan and Himachal Pradesh. It is threatened by habitat loss.

References 

Marchantiales
Marchantiales genera
Endangered plants
Flora of Sichuan
Flora of West Himalaya
Monotypic bryophyte genera
Taxonomy articles created by Polbot